is an Australian professional tennis player. Following a successful career at the University of North Carolina at Chapel Hill, Hijikata went professional and has a career high ATP singles ranking of world No. 116 achieved on 13 February 2023 and in doubles of world No. 32 achieved on 20 February 2023.

Early life and education
Hijikata was born in Sydney, Australia to a Japanese immigrant parents. He began playing tennis at age three or four. He attended The King's School in Sydney from 2013-2016. His father is a tennis coach. His favourite player growing up was Lleyton Hewitt and later, Kei Nishikori. Hijikata played college tennis for North Carolina Tar Heels men's tennis from 2019 to 2021.

Career

2018–2021: Career beginnings

In March 2018, Hijikata made his ITF debut at the Australia F3 in Mornington, Australia. He won his first match the following week at the Australia F4.

In October 2018, Hijikata won silver at the Tennis at the 2018 Summer Youth Olympics – Boys' doubles, teaming with Bulgaria's Adrian Andreev.

In January 2019, Hijikata was given a wildcard into the 2019 Australian Open – Men's singles qualifying. He lost in the first round to Hiroki Moriya.
In March, Hijikata reached the quarter-final and semi-finals in the ITF events in Mornington, Australia. Later that year, in September, Hijikata won his first professional singles title at the M15 Fayetteville, in Arkansas, United States.

In January 2020, Hijikata was given a wildcard into the 2020 Australian Open – Men's singles qualifying, where he made the second round.
Also in February 2021, he was given a wildcard into the 2021 Australian Open – Men's singles qualifying and he made the second round.

Hijikata won his second and third ITF titles in July 2021 and claimed a total of four ITF Futures singles titles during 2021. He finished 2021 with a singles ranking of 369 as of 22 November 2021.

2022: ATP & Major debut, Maiden win & Challenger title, top 200
In January 2022, Hijikata made his ATP tour debut at the 2022 Melbourne Summer Set 1 after qualifying for the main draw. It was also Hijikata's first top 100 win, defeating world number 98 Henri Laaksonen in the final qualifying round. He lost in the first round to eventual finalist, Maxime Cressy. He also played doubles with Christopher O'Connell.

Hijikata lost in the second round of the 2022 Australian Open – Men's singles qualifying.

In April, Hijikata broke into the ATP top 300 after winning consecutive ITF tournaments in California in March 2022.

In August, he qualified for the 2022 Los Cabos Open and reached the round of 16 recording his first ATP win after the retirement of the Mexican wildcard debutant Rodrigo Pacheco Méndez. He lost to top seed and World No. 1 Daniil Medvedev who recorded his 250th match win. As a result he moved one position shy of the top 200 on 8 August 2022. 
He made his Grand Slam debut at the US Open as a wildcard.

He won his maiden Challenger title in Playford, Australia and moved 33 positions up into the top 160 at world No. 159 on 31 October 2022. He became the youngest Australian to win a Challenger title since 2018, when the-then 19-year-old Alexei Popyrin won in Jinan, China.

2023: First Major win in singles & title in doubles, top 125 in singles, Masters debut 
Hijikata was given a wildcard into the Australian Open, where he recorded his first Grand Slam win by defeating Yannick Hanfmann in a come-from-behind victory. He lost in the second round to third seed Stefanos Tsitsipas. 

Pairing with Jason Kubler for the men's doubles, they won the title after defeating three seeded teams en route; sixth seeds Lloyd Glasspool and Harri Heliövaara in the second round, saved a match point in the third round against Tomislav Brkić and Gonzalo Escobar, top seeds and world No. 1 doubles pair Wesley Koolhof and Neal Skupski in the quarterfinals, and eighth seeds Marcel Granollers and Horacio Zeballos in the semifinals. They went on to defeat Hugo Nys and Jan Zieliński in the final, becoming the second consecutive all-Australian champions at the event.

At the 2023 Delray Beach Open he reached the semifinals in doubles partnering American Reese Stalder and defeating second seeded pair of Jamie Murray and Michael Venus in the quarterfinals. He reached the final defeating Mexican duo Hans Hach Verdugo
and Miguel Ángel Reyes-Varela.

He made his Masters 1000 debut in Indian Wells as a qualifier, and defeated Mikael Ymer in the first round in straight sets. He lost in the second round to 30th seed Sebastian Baez.

Awards
In 2018 and 2019, Hijikata won the Newcombe Medal for Male Junior Athlete of the Year.

Grand Slam finals

Men's doubles: 1 (1 title)

ATP career finals

Doubles: 2 (1 title, 1 runner-up)

Challenger and Future Finals

Singles: 12 (9–3)

Performance timelines

Singles 
Current through the 2023 Australian Open.

Doubles 
Current through the 2023 Australian Open.

ATP Challengers and ITF Futures/World Tennis Tour finals

Singles: 11 (8–3)
{|
|-valign=top
|

Doubles: 3 (2–1)
{|
|-valign=top
|

ITF World Tennis Tour Juniors

Singles: 4 (2 titles, 2 runners-up)

Doubles: 10 (6 title, 4 runners-up)

References

External links

2001 births
Living people
Australian male tennis players
Tennis players from Sydney
Tennis players at the 2018 Summer Youth Olympics
Australian people of Japanese descent
North Carolina Tar Heels men's tennis players
People educated at The King's School, Parramatta